= Great Bay de l'Eau Formation =

- Stratigraphic range: Late Devonian
- Type: Formation
- Unit of: Group

Lithology
- Primary: Non-marine conglomerate (siliciclastic)

Location
- Region: Newfoundland
- Country: Canada
- Occurrence of the Great Bay de l'Eau Formation in southeastern Newfoundland

The Great Bay de l'Eau Formation is a formation cropping out in Newfoundland, Canada. It lies northeast of the French overseas collectivity of Saint Pierre and Miquelon.
